John S. Glas Fieldhouse is a 2,399-seat hockey arena in Bemidji, Minnesota, United States. It was home to the Bemidji State University Beavers men's and women's ice hockey teams until October 2010. (The men's and women's teams play in the Western Collegiate Hockey Association.)  The building, a part of a larger fieldhouse which contains the BSU Gymnasium and other athletic facilities.  It was opened on November 17, 1967, and was dedicated on February 10, 1968.  On October 1, 1975, the building was renamed in honor of John S. Glas, the acting president of the university at the time of the building of the arena.  The Beaver ice hockey teams moved into the Sanford Center in October 2010.  The Fieldhouse is now the practice facility for many Bemidji State athletic programs including Baseball, Softball, and golf.  Bemidji Wiffle Ball began playing their games in The Fieldhouse beginning in 2014 and continued until Spring of 2017 when the Fieldhouse was renovated.  The facility now serves as a practice facility for BSU Sports.

External links
 Facility information at the BSU Athletics website

Indoor arenas in Minnesota
College ice hockey venues in the United States
Sports venues in Minnesota
Buildings and structures in Beltrami County, Minnesota
Indoor ice hockey venues in Minnesota
1967 establishments in Minnesota
Sports venues completed in 1967
Bemidji State Beavers ice hockey